The Kara-Jygach Rocks is a nature monument located in Aksy District of Jalal-Abad Region of Kyrgyzstan. The outstanding feature of the monument is its striking series of numerous cliffs and pillars of red sandstone, which were formed as a result of wind erosion. In 1975, the monument was declared a geological protected area. The rocks are situated on the left bank of the river Kara-Suu, near the village Jangy-Jol. They reach up to 50 m height, and stretch over a distance of 1 km.

References

Natural monuments of Kyrgyzstan
Rock formations of Kyrgyzstan
Protected areas established in 1975